Doğrular is a quarter of the town Posof, Posof District, Ardahan Province, Turkey. Its population is 65 (2021).

References

Posof District